Choice Cuts: The Capricorn Years 1991–1999 is a 14-song compilation by Athens, Georgia's Widespread Panic. Song selections originated from the albums Space Wrangler, Widespread Panic, Everyday, Ain't Life Grand, Bombs & Butterflies, 'Til the Medicine Takes, and the live album Light Fuse, Get Away. Each album was released on Capricorn Records.

Track listing
All tracks by Widespread Panic except where noted.

 "Travelin' Light" (J. J. Cale) – 3:36
 "Chilly Water" – 5:40
 "Love Tractor" – 5:09
 "Weight of the World" – 4:50
 "Papa's Home" – 6:40
 "Ain't Life Grand" – 4:48
 "Blackout Blues" – 5:17
 "Rebirtha" – 7:19
 "Aunt Avis" (Vic Chesnutt) – 3:26
 "Blue Indian" – 4:52
 "Climb to Safety" (Music, Jerry Joseph and Glen Esparza Lyrics, Jerry Joseph) – 4:42
 "Surprise Valley" – 6:15
 "Pickin' Up the Pieces" – 5:30
 "Pigeons" – 8:58

Personnel

Widespread Panic
 John "JB" Bell – vocals, guitar
 Michael Houser – guitar, vocals
 David Schools – bass, vocals
 Todd Nance – drums
 Domingo "Sunny" Ortiz – percussion
 John "JoJo" Hermann – keyboards, vocals
 Tim White – keyboards
 T. Lavitz – keyboards

Technical
 Producer – John Keane & Widespread Panic (Tracks 1, 2, 13, 14)
 Producer – John Keane (Tracks 6–12)
 Producer – Johnny Sandlin for Duck Tape Music (Tracks 3–5)
 Compilation Producer – Widespread Panic and Darren Salmieri
 Mastered by Mark Wilder at Sony Studios, New York (April 2007)
 Art and Package Design – Chris Bilheimer
 Band Photo – Johnny Buzzerio
 Project Direction – Adam Farber

Management
 Sam Lanier, Buck Williams (PGA) and Brown Cat – Gomer, Garrie, Ellie, Crumpy, Chris, Larry, Greta and Matt

2001 compilation albums
Widespread Panic compilation albums
Albums produced by John Keane (record producer)